Christopher Francis Burne is a United States Air Force lieutenant general and was Judge Advocate General of the Air Force from May 2014 until May 2018. He retired on July 1, 2018.

Biography
Christopher Francis Burne was born on October 7, 1958, in Dunmore, Pennsylvania, Burne's father Francis Robert Burne was a decorated bombardier in World War II. Burne attended the University of Scranton and Pennsylvania State University - Dickinson Law.

Career
Burne joined the Air Force in 1983 and was assigned to the Eighth Air Force. In 1987, he was assigned to Headquarters Strategic Air Command. He served as Offutt Air Force Base from 1989 until 1990, when he was assigned to Vandenberg Air Force Base. There, he was Deputy Staff Judge Advocate with the Western Space and Missile Center and the Twentieth Air Force. He would later deploy to serve in the Gulf War.

In 1993, Burne was stationed at Soesterberg Air Base in the Netherlands. From there, he became Director, Operations Law, United States Central Command and Staff Judge Advocate of the 20th Fighter Wing.

Following the September 11 attacks, he took part in organizing the Air Force's mobilization and response.

In May 2014, he was confirmed by the Senate to be The Judge Advocate General of the Air Force. Prior to this, he was assigned as the Staff Judge Advocate at Headquarters Air Combat Command. Burne retired from the Judge Advocate General position on July 1, 2018.

Awards and decorations

References

Living people
People from Dunmore, Pennsylvania
United States Air Force generals
Recipients of the Legion of Merit
United States Air Force personnel of the Gulf War
American lawyers
University of Scranton alumni
Dickinson School of Law alumni
Military personnel from Pennsylvania
1958 births